The 2011 Men's World Team Squash Championships is the men's edition of the 2011 World Team Squash Championships organized by the World Squash Federation, which serves as the world team championship for squash players. The event were held in Paderborn, Germany and took place from August 21 to August 27, 2011. The tournament was organized by the World Squash Federation and the German Squash Association. The Egypt team won his third World Team Championships beating the English team in the final.

Participating teams
A total of 32 teams competed from all the five confederations: Africa, America, Asia, Europe and Oceania. For Colombia, Namibia and Ukraine, it was their first participation at a world team championship.

Seeds

Squads

  England
 Nick Matthew
 James Willstrop
 Peter Barker
 Daryl Selby

  Germany
 Simon Rösner
 Jens Schoor
 Raphael Kandra
 Andre Haschker

  Spain
 Borja Golán
 Alejandro Garbi
 Ivan Flores
 David Vidal

  Ireland
 Arthur Gaskin
 Derek Ryan
 Steve Richardson
 Conor O'Hare

  Egypt
 Ramy Ashour
 Karim Darwish
 Mohamed El Shorbagy
 Hisham Ashour

  New Zealand
 Martin Knight
 Campbell Grayson
 Evan Williams
 Paul Coll

  Hong Kong
 Max Lee
 Dick Lau
 Leo Au
 Tsz Fung Yip

  Sweden
 Christian Drakenberg
 Sebastian Viktor
 Joakim Larsson
 Alex Christenson

  France
 Grégory Gaultier
 Thierry Lincou
 Mathieu Castagnet
 Grégoire Marche

  Netherlands
 Laurens Jan Anjema
 Dylan Bennett
 Piëdro Schweertman
 Bart Ravelli

  Argentina
 Gonzalo Miranda
 Hernan D'Arcangelo
 Roberto Pezzota
 Juan Pablo Roude

  South Korea
 Nyeon Ho Lee
 Seung Taek Lee
 Seung Joon Lee
 Se Hyun Lee

  Australia
 David Palmer
 Cameron Pilley
 Stewart Boswell
 Aaron Frankcomb

  Finland
 Olli Tuominen
 Henrik Mustonen
 Matias Tuomi
 Arttu Moisio

  Colombia
 Andres Vargas
 Javier Castilla
 Juan Vargas
 Jairo Navarro

  Bermuda
 Micah Franklin
 Robbie Maycock
 Chris Stout
 not held

  Malaysia
 Mohd Azlan Iskandar
 Ong Beng Hee
 Mohd Nafiizwan Adnan
 Kamran Khan

  Pakistan
 Aamir Atlas Khan
 Yasir Butt
 Nasir Iqbal
 Waqar Mehboob

  Denmark
 Kristian Frost Olesen
 Rasmus Nielsen
 Morten Sorensen
 Michael Frilund

  Austria
 Aqeel Rehman
 Leopold Czaska
 Jakob Dirnberger
 Andreas Freudensprung

  India
 Saurav Ghosal
 Siddarth Suchde
 Harinder Pal Sandhu
 Mahesh Mangaonkar

  South Africa
 Steve Coppinger
 Shaun Le Roux
 Clinton Leeuw
 Rodney Durbach

  Kuwait
 Abdullah Al Muzayen
 Ammar Altamimi
 Ali Bader Al-Ramzi
 Yousif Nizar Saleh

  Hungary
 Márk Krajcsák
 Marton Szaboky
 Sandor Fulop
 Peter Hoffman

  Canada
 Shahier Razik
 Shawn Delierre
 Andrew McDougall
 Andrew Schnell

  Mexico
 Arturo Salazar
 Eric Gálvez
 Cesar Salazar
 not held

  Scotland
 Alan Clyne
 Stuart Crawford
 Chris Small
 Harry Leitch

  Namibia
 Marco Becker
 Norbert Dorgeloh
 Andrew Forrest
 Angelo Titus

  United States
 Julian Illingworth
 Gilly Lane
 Chris Gordon
 Todd Harrity

  Italy
 Stéphane Galifi
 Davide Bianchetti
 Marcus Berrett
 Amr Swelim

  Switzerland
 Nicolas Müller
 Reiko Peter
 John Williams
 Lukas Burkhart

  Ukraine
 Ruslan Sorochynsky
 Kostyantyn Rybalchenko
 Valerii Fedoruk
 Denys Podvornyi

Group stage results

Pool A

Pool B

Pool C

Pool D

Pool E

Pool F

Pool G

Pool H

Finals

Draw

Results

Quarter-finals

Semi-finals

Final

Post-tournament team ranking

See also 
World Team Squash Championships
World Squash Federation
2011 Men's World Open Squash Championship

References

External links 
Men's World Team Squash Championships 2011 Official Website
Squash Site World Team 2011 Official Website

W
World Squash Championships
Squash
Paderborn
Squash tournaments in Germany
International sports competitions hosted by Germany